Nares Gladley Marsh is a  Site of Special Scientific Interest north-west of Leighton Buzzard in Bedfordshire. It was notified in 1990 under Section 28  of the Wildlife and Countryside Act 1981, and the local planning authority is Central Bedfordshire Council.

The site is on the Lower Greensand in the valley of the River Ouzel. It has marshland with a number of springs, and it has rich plant communities. On higher areas there is acidic grassland.

The site is private land and there is no public access.

References

Sites of Special Scientific Interest in Bedfordshire